Pasila is a part of Helsinki, Finland, that is both a central-northern neighbourhood and district, bordering the areas of Alppila to the south, the Central Park (Keskuspuisto) to the west, and Vallila to the east.

Pasila is a major transportation hub. At its heart is the Pasila railway station, the second busiest station in Finland. The station serves about 130,000 people per day via 900 trains, 400 trams and 850 buses.

Central Pasila 

The eastern and western parts of Pasila were formerly separated by a large railroad classification yard before the development of Central Pasila, beginning in 2014. Central Pasila is currently home to the major sports and music venue Helsinki Halli and the Tripla complex, which includes a hotel of about 430 rooms, 50,000 square metres of office space (including the headquarters of telecom operator Telia Finland), about 400 residential flats and the largest commercial center in the Nordic countries with 250 shops. 

There are several projects under construction or planning near the railway station. In connection with Tripla, several Trigoni skyscrapers are planned, the tallest of which, about 180 meters high from the top of the building, will be visible, in good weather, all the way to the Estonian coast.

West 
Western Pasila was built during the 1980s. It is a mainly residential area with approximately 4,500 inhabitants. The apartment buildings in Western Pasila are skinned with red bricks.  The Finnish national broadcasting company Yle as well as the commercial MTV3 have their main premises in the northern end of the area.
Helsinki's main police station is also located in Western Pasila.

Before the 1970s, Pasila was home to dilapidated wooden houses and was known for cheap rent and crime. It was then known simply as Wooden Pasila. Today only a few of the old wooden structures exist.

East 

Eastern Pasila is a highly mixed-use area of offices, flats and commercial spaces, built in the 1970s and 1980s. In terms of urban planning the most distinct feature of the area is its pedestrian-friendly design, based around a raised, pedestrian-only podium that connects to all buildings. Master planning of the area was led by Reijo Jallinoja and was based on his 1967 thesis work. The area is home to about 5,000 residents and 11,000 workplaces. Notable institutions include Helsinki Business College, Haaga–Helia University of Applied Sciences, the Helsinki City Theatre company, the main library of the city and Finland's largest convention center, Messukeskus. The area is a telecom and media center of national significance with the headquarters of telecom operator Elisa and a major presence of telecom operator DNA, who also own the TV studios at the Asemapäällikönhovi building, operated by Streamteam Nordic. The area is home to Helsinki's most vibrant street-art scene as well as the Helsinki Urban Art center, the international hub for street art in Finland.

North 

Northern Pasila is mainly known for Ilmala rail yard and a 2010s residential area called Postipuisto.

References

External links